Knie is a German language surname. It is a nickname for a person with a protruding knee – and may refer to:
Roberta Knie (1938–2017), American dramatic soprano
Rolf Knie (1949), Swiss painter and actor

References 

German-language surnames
Surnames from nicknames